Petar Jelić (born 18 October 1986) is a Bosnian Serb former international footballer.

Club career
Jelić played for FK Modriča Maxima in the Premier League of Bosnia and Herzegovina until he signed with 1. FC Nürnberg of the Bundesliga. Nürnberg had loaned Jelić to Second Division side FC Carl Zeiss Jena, but he could not gain a place in the first team. After his return to Nuremberg, he was sold to OFK Beograd. In summer 2010 he joined Russian side FC Volga Nizhny Novgorod where he stayed until summer 2013, with an exception of a loan to FC Dinamo Tbilisi in 2011. In summer 2013 he returned to Serbia and joined Serbian SuperLiga side FK Novi Pazar. Jelić transferred to China League One side Guangdong Sunray Cave on 23 March 2014.

In summer 2014 he returned to Serbia and joined FK Rad. In his debut in the 2014–15 Serbian SuperLiga he scored five goals in the victory over Voždovac by 6–1.  He set the record of goals per game (5) since the formation of the Serbian SuperLiga in 2006.

International career
He made his debut for Bosnia and Herzegovina in a May 2006 friendly match away against South Korea and has earned a total of 2 caps, scoring no goals. His second and final international was another friendly, 5 days later against Iran.

Personal life
Jelić's father, Milan Jelić, was a Bosnian Serb politician and the 6th President of Republika Srpska.

Honours

Player

Individual
Performance
Bosnian Premier League Top Goalscorer: 2005–06 (19 goals)

References

External links

1986 births
Living people
People from Modriča
Serbs of Bosnia and Herzegovina
Association football forwards
Bosnia and Herzegovina footballers
Bosnia and Herzegovina under-21 international footballers
Bosnia and Herzegovina international footballers
FK Modriča players
1. FC Nürnberg players
FC Carl Zeiss Jena players
OFK Beograd players
FC Volga Nizhny Novgorod players
FC Dinamo Tbilisi players
FK Novi Pazar players
Guangdong Sunray Cave players
FK Rad players
Premier League of Bosnia and Herzegovina players
2. Bundesliga players
Oberliga (football) players
Serbian SuperLiga players
Russian First League players
Erovnuli Liga players
Russian Premier League players
China League One players
Bosnia and Herzegovina expatriate footballers
Expatriate footballers in Germany
Bosnia and Herzegovina expatriate sportspeople in Germany
Expatriate footballers in Serbia
Bosnia and Herzegovina expatriate sportspeople in Serbia
Expatriate footballers in Russia
Bosnia and Herzegovina expatriate sportspeople in Russia
Expatriate footballers in Georgia (country)
Bosnia and Herzegovina expatriate sportspeople in Georgia (country)
Expatriate footballers in China
Bosnia and Herzegovina expatriate sportspeople in China